The Salton Sea is a saline lake in the Colorado Desert of Southern California.

Salton Sea may also refer to:

Places
 Salton Sea Airport
 Salton Sea Beach, California, a community on the lake
 Salton Sea State Recreation Area, a state park located on the northeastern side of the sea
 Naval Auxiliary Air Station Salton Sea, a defunct U.S. Navy facility

Entertainment
 Salton Sea, a 2012 album by Tomas Barfod
 The Salton Sea (2002 film), starring Val Kilmer and Vincent D'Onofrio
 The Salton Sea (2016 film), starring Jamie Anne Allman
 Salton Sea (2018 film), starring Joel Bissonnette
 Miracle in the Desert:  The Rise and Fall of the Salton Sea (2020 film), award-winning documentary

Other
 Salton Sea Authority

See also
 Salton (disambiguation)
 Salt Lake (disambiguation)
 Salton Trough
 Salton Sink
 Dead Sea or the Salt Sea